A Commonwealth XI cricket team toured India in the 1953–54 season and played 21 first-class matches including five against an All-India XI. In India the team was known as the Silver Jubilee Overseas Cricket Team, or SJOC, as the tour was arranged to mark the 25th anniversary of the Board of Control for Cricket in India.

Captained by Ben Barnett, who also kept wicket, the team had several well-known players including Frank Worrell, Sonny Ramadhin, Roy Marshall, Peter Loader and Reg Simpson. The series was won by India, 2–1.

References

Sources
 Wisden Cricketers' Almanack 1955, pp. 812–840.

External links
 Commonwealth in India, 1953–54 at Cricinfo
 Commonwealth XI in India, 1953–54 at CricketArchive

1953 in Indian cricket
1954 in Indian cricket
Indian cricket seasons from 1945–46 to 1969–70
International cricket competitions from 1945–46 to 1960
Multi-national cricket tours of India